The Elst–Dordrecht railway is a railway line in the Netherlands running from Elst to Dordrecht, passing through Tiel, Geldermalsen and Gorinchem. It is also called the Betuwelijn (Batavia line). MerwedeLingelijn is the name of the western part between Dordrecht and Geldermalsen, which is operated by Qbuzz. Tiel - Elst as part of the service Tiel - Arnhem is operated by Arriva and Nederlandse Spoorwegen (NS) operates Geldermalsen - Tiel as part of the service Utrecht - Tiel. The railway connects to the Arnhem–Nijmegen railway in Elst. There were two connections to the Arnhem–Nijmegen railway in the past from the junction near Vork station; one to Elst and towards Nijmegen connecting near Ressen. The Nijmegen junction was used until 1990 and torn down during construction of the Betuweroute in order of creating a junction between the Betuweroute from Rotterdam and the Arnhem–Nijmegen railway towards both Arnhem and Nijmegen.

Timeline
1 November 1882 - Railway line opens between Elst and Geldermalsen
1 December 1883 - Railway line opens between Geldermalsen and Gorinchem
16 July 1885 - Railway line opens between Gorinchem and Dordrecht
1916: Schaapsteeg stop closes 
15 May 1927 - Giessen-Oudekerk station closes
15 May 1931 - Vork station closes
15 May 1938 - Arkel, Echteld, and Valburg stations close
10 June 1940 - Arkel station re-opens
1950: Wadenoijen station closes
2 June 1957 - Hardinxveld-Giessendam station opens
28 May 1978 - the section Geldermalsen - Tiel is electrified. As a result, diesel trains no longer service the complete Utrecht - Tiel - Arnhem/Nijmegen track, but as of then they only service Tiel to Arnhem/Nijmegen forcing passengers to change trains in Tiel.
31 May 1987 - Regular train services Tiel - Nijmegen cease. Only peak hour services remain. Passengers are forced to change trains in Elst.
27 May 1990 - Dordrecht Stadspolders station opens; the train service Tiel - Nijmegen ceases completely.
31 May 1992 - the section Dordrecht - Geldermalsen is electrified
1 April 2005 - Syntus wins contract to operate the service Tiel - Elst (- Arnhem) when NS stopped servicing this track.
10 December 2006 - Arriva wins contract to operate the service Dordrecht - Geldermalsen ending the former NS services. Arriva operates a half-hourly service 7 days a week, starting earlier and finishing later. Passengers are offered improved better train changes at Dordrecht for Rotterdam, Den Haag, and Amsterdam and at Geldermalsen for Utrecht
14 September 2008 - New Spurt material is put into service by Arriva.
11 December 2011 - Sliedrecht Baanhoek and Hardinxveld Blauwe Zoom stations open
16 April 2012 - Boven-Hardinxveld station opens
9 December 2012 - Arriva wins contract to operate the service Tiel - Elst - Arnhem ending the Syntus services
9 December 2018 - Qbuzz wins contract to operare the service Dordrecht - Geldermalsen ending the Arriva services

Future
In future new stations will be added.

These are:
Gorinchem Noord (Between Gorinchem and Arkel)
Leerdam Broekgraaf (Between Leerdam and Beesd)

A quarter-hourly service is operated between Gorinchem and Dordrecht after creating passing loops at Dordrecht Stadspolders and Boven-Hardinxveld.

Train services
2 hourly local services (stoptrein) Dordrecht - Gorinchem - Geldermalsen (Qbuzz)
2 hourly local services (stoptrein) Dordrecht - Gorinchem (Qbuzz)
2 hourly local services (Sprinter) Utrecht - Geldermalsen - Tiel between Geldermalsen and Tiel (NS)
1 hourly local service (stoptrein) Tiel - Elst - Arnhem between Elst and Tiel (Arriva)

Railway lines in the Netherlands
Railway lines in Gelderland
Railway lines in South Holland
Railway lines in Utrecht (province)
Transport in Dordrecht
Overbetuwe
Railway lines opened in 1882